Haj Saleh Hammam is a historical hammam located in Saqqez, Iran. It belongs to the Safavid-Zandian period and is located in the old part of the city within the Bazaar of Saqqez. This historical building was registered as one of the national monuments of Iran on November 7, 2000, with the number 2830.

Structure
This hammam is a complete set that has all the features of an old bath and includes different sections such as bineh, sarbineh, hothouse, treasury, privat parts, ton storage (bath fuel tank), water and sewage system.
This bath dates back to the Safavid era, but parts of it were annexed to the building during the Zandian era, and in fact is the oldest bath left in the city of Saqqez and one of the oldest hammam in Kurdistan province.
The interior of the bath, like most historic baths, has a limestone cover with a variety of motifs, including hunting scenes, winged angels, and geometric motifs.
The framing and lime of the roof and walls and the carving of the columns are the decorations of the building.
The columns of the bath are made of stone and are three pieces and are octagonal. Skylights in the center of each dome direct outside light into the bathroom environment.

Gallery

See also
Iran National Heritage List

References

17th-century mosques
Public baths in Iran
Architecture in Iran
Tourist attractions in Saqqez
Saqqez County
Buildings and structures in Kurdistan
Tourist attractions in Kurdistan